The Madison Black Wolf was a Northern League baseball club located in Madison, Wisconsin from 1996 to 2000.  They played their home games at Warner Park which was then nicknamed "The Wolf Den". The club was owned by Madison Baseball, LLC, which folded operations following the 2000 season. The club moved then to Lincoln, Nebraska, where it is known as the Lincoln Saltdogs.

The Black Wolf made the playoffs in their inaugural season, losing to the St. Paul Saints in the first round. They followed that up with four straight losing seasons. They finished their five-year run in Madison with a 191–235 record, a .448 winning percentage.

Jimmy Buffett was part owner of the team when it started its first season in 1996.

References

External links
Madison Black Wolf at NLFan.com

Northern League (baseball, 1993–2010) teams
Sports in Madison, Wisconsin
Defunct independent baseball league teams
Professional baseball teams in Wisconsin
Defunct baseball teams in Wisconsin
Baseball teams disestablished in 2000
Baseball teams established in 1996
1996 establishments in Wisconsin
2000 disestablishments in Wisconsin